was a Japanese actor, suit actor and stunt performer. He is best known for playing Godzilla in 12 consecutive films, starting from the original Godzilla (1954) until Godzilla vs. Gigan (1972). Nakajima also played various other kaiju in Toho's tokusatsu films, including: Mothra (1961) and The War of the Gargantuas (1966) and also appeared in a minor role in Akira Kurosawa's Seven Samurai (1954).

Career
Nakajima was born in Yamagata. His first credited role in a motion picture was in the 1952 film Sword for Hire. He began his career as a stunt actor in samurai films and he acted in a small role in the 1954 film Seven Samurai, portraying a bandit slain by master swordsman Kyūzo (Seiji Miyaguchi).

He was considered by many to be the best suit actor in the long history of the Godzilla franchise. At the time, Toho's special effects director, Eiji Tsuburaya considered him completely invaluable, and he was employed to essay the roles of most of the kaiju (Japanese monsters) during his career as a suit actor. 

Before shooting began for the first Godzilla movie, in 1954, Nakajima said he spent a week at Tokyo's Ueno Zoo, where he studied the motion of elephants and bears. He said he threw a piece of bread at the bears to see how they moved to catch it. He also studied the heavy, ponderous gait of the elephants. "When elephants walk, they never show the bottom of their feet," he said. When filming began, he said the original suit weighed 100 kilograms and required two men to help him put it on. "How can I act in this thing?" Nakajima said he asked himself. He eventually mastered the suit, and went on to teach the other suit actors who came after him.

After 24 years, Nakajima retired from suit acting upon completion of Godzilla vs. Gigan (1972), when the studio cycled him out of their contract actor system, after it split into several subsidiaries in 1970. He stayed employed by Toho for several years, and was reportedly transferred to a job at its bowling alley, located on the now defunct studio lot.

Beginning in the late 1990s, Nakajima made a series of personal appearances at various Japanese monster-themed conventions. He appeared at the Monsterpalooza convention in Burbank, California in April 2011. His Japanese-language autobiography, 『怪獣人生 元祖ゴジラ俳優・中島春雄』 (Monster Life: Haruo Nakajima, the Original Godzilla Actor), was released in 2010.

Death
On August 7, 2017, several media outlets reported that Nakajima had died, at the age of 88. The following day, on August 8, his daughter Sonoe Nakajima confirmed that he had died of pneumonia. In 2018, asteroid 110408 Nakajima was named in his honour. The film Godzilla: King of the Monsters (2019) was dedicated to his memory.

Filmography

Film

Television

References

External links

 
 Roberto, John Rocco. Shigeko Kojima  (trans.) Winter 1999. "An Interview with Godzilla: Hauro Nakajima", Originally published in Kaiju Fan.
 Biography of Haruo Nakajima in comic book format

1929 births
2017 deaths
Deaths from pneumonia in Japan
Japanese male film actors
Japanese male television actors
People from Yamagata Prefecture
Godzilla (franchise)